José "Pepe" Moré Bonet (born 29 January 1953) is a Spanish retired football midfielder and manager.

His career was closely associated to Real Valladolid, as both a player and coach. Over the course of eight seasons, he amassed La Liga totals of 232 games and 19 goals for the club.

Playing career
Born in L'Ametlla del Vallès, Barcelona, Catalonia, Moré started his senior career with FC Barcelona's reserves. In the summer of 1976, after a couple of Segunda División seasons, he joined another team at that level, Real Valladolid.

Moré remained with the Castile and León side the following 12 years, appearing and starting in all 38 league games in his fourth season to help them promote to La Liga while scoring eight goals. He retired in June 1988 at the age of 35, having played 448 competitive matches for his main club.

Coaching career
Moré started coaching immediately after retiring, with Real Valladolid Promesas. On several occasions, however, he would be appointed interim of the main squad, and would also be in charge for two full seasons, 2001–02 and 2002–03, always leading the team to top-flight safety; in addition, he acted as assistant to several managers during his tenure.

In the following years, Moré worked in division two with CD Tenerife and CD Castellón, being dismissed by the latter midway through his third season.

Personal life
Moré's son, Xavier, was also a footballer and a midfielder. He too represented Valladolid, being coached by his father.

Honours

Player
Barcelona B
Tercera División: 1973–74

Valladolid
Copa de la Liga: 1984

References

External links

1953 births
Living people
People from Vallès Oriental
Sportspeople from the Province of Barcelona
Spanish footballers
Footballers from Catalonia
Association football midfielders
La Liga players
Segunda División players
Tercera División players
FC Barcelona Atlètic players
Real Valladolid players
Spanish football managers
La Liga managers
Segunda División managers
Segunda División B managers
Tercera División managers
Real Valladolid managers
CD Tenerife managers
CD Castellón managers